Acanthophrynus is a genus of tailless whipscorpions in the family Phrynidae. There is at least one described species in Acanthophrynus, A. coronatus.

Acanthophrynus coronatus 
Acanthophrynus coronatus is a tailless whipscorpion, it was first described by Butler in 1873, though it was under the name Phrynus coronatus. It is found in Mexico, inhabiting deciduous tropical forests, and is sometimes kept as a pet.

Description 
This arachnids grow to a leg-span of about 18cm, being about 4cm wide, with a lifespan of around 7 years. They own light red pedipalps, and a light brown - brown prosoma, the opisthosoma being of the same color with some darker brown stripping. All of the legs are a lighter brown than the prosoma, reaching almost a yellow color. While they lack venomous glands, they do own stridulating organs.

Habitat 
They inhabit the deciduous tropical forests of Mexico, in many states facing the Pacific Ocean. This forests are made between 0 and 1900m above sea level, though its rare they surpass 1500m. The average annual temperature in this regions are 20 to 29 ºC, with average rainfall between 300mm and 1800mm, this of course depending on the region.

Behavior 
This species as all in the Phrynidae family are nocturnal, remaining mostly in hiding during the day, they are mostly tree dwelling, and will rarely be seen on the ground. They are best kept solitary, although they have some tolerance for those of the same egg sack. Pairs can also be kept together for multiple days, but this of course comes with risks.

References

Amblypygi